Peggy Cummins (born Augusta Margaret Diane Fuller; 18 December 1925 – 29  December 2017) was an Irish actress, born in Wales, who is best known for her performance in Joseph H. Lewis's Gun Crazy (1950), playing a trigger-happy femme fatale, who robs banks with her lover. In 2020, she was listed at number 16 on The Irish Times list of Ireland's greatest film actors.

Biography

Early life
Cummins was born Augusta Margaret Diane Fuller in Prestatyn, Denbighshire, Wales. Her Irish parents were visiting there when a storm kept them from returning to their home in Dublin.

She lived most of her early life in Killiney, Dublin, where she was educated, and later in London. Her father was Dublin-born Franklin Bland Fuller (1897–1943), who was a grandson of architect James Franklin Fuller.  Her mother was actress Margaret Cummins (1889–1973), who played such film roles as Anna in Smart Woman and Emily in The Sign of the Ram (both 1948).

Early acting career
There is a legend that actor Patrick Brock noticed Cummins at a Dublin tram stop and introduced her to Dublin's Gate Theatre Company, but she told Barbara Roisman Cooper when interviewed aged 88: "That is absolutely nonsense." As a child in Dublin, she attended the Abbey School of Ballet. From there she was spotted and chosen for a non-speaking role in The Duchess of Malfi at the Gate Theatre. "I played one of the children, only seen in silhouette because they had been murdered ... that was my start in the theatre." Cummins’ London stage debut was in the role of Maryann, the juvenile lead in Let’s Pretend, a children’s revue which opened at the St James’s Theatre on her 13th birthday.

On the basis of this she was cast in the British film directed by Herbert Mason, Dr. O'Dowd (1940). As part of an agreement with the London County Council, Cummins was limited to five hours of filming per day and had to be supervised by a governess. Cummins had supporting roles in Salute John Citizen (1942) and Old Mother Riley Detective (1943).

She appeared on the London stage in 1943 aged 17, playing the part of 12-year-old Fuffy in Junior Miss at the Saville Theatre and in the title role of Alice in Wonderland in 1944 at the Palace Theatre.

Her first major film was English Without Tears (1944) with Michael Wilding and Lilli Palmer, directed by Harold French and released in the United States as Her Man Gilbey. She followed this with Welcome, Mr. Washington (1944).

Forever Amber and 20th Century Fox
In October 1945, Cummins was brought to Hollywood by Darryl F. Zanuck, head of 20th Century-Fox, not initially - as is widely believed - to play Amber in Kathleen Winsor's Forever Amber (1947). She tested for a role in Cluny Brown (1946) before being considered for Amber. Production started in January 1946, but because she was considered "too young", she was soon replaced by Linda Darnell.

Zanuck then gave her a lead role in a mystery, Moss Rose (1947), directed by Gregory Ratoff, which was a financial disappointment. He tried her in two films directed by Joseph L. Mankiewicz, The Late George Apley (1947), playing the daughter of Ronald Colman, and Escape (1948), co starring with Rex Harrison. Cummins then appeared with Charles Coburn in Green Grass of Wyoming (1948), a sequel to My Friend Flicka released in 1943.

Cummins returned to England to appear in That Dangerous Age (1948) for Alexander Korda, directed by Gregory Ratoff) with Myrna Loy and Roger Livesey. She went back to the US for Gun Crazy (1950). "I loved being in Hollywood", she told The Sunday Times a few years before she died, but it was her last film shot in the United States.

Return to Britain
She returned to London in 1950 to marry and work in British films.  She made My Daughter Joy (1950) for Korda and Ratoff, co-starring with Edward G. Robinson and starred in Who Goes There! (1952) for Korda and Street Corner (1953) for Muriel Box. Around the same time, she appeared in Meet Mr. Lucifer, an Ealing Studios comedy, and Always a Bride with Ronald Squires (both also 1953).

Cummins was in The Love Lottery (1954) with David Niven, and To Dorothy a Son (1954) with Shelley Winters and John Gregson.  She starred in The March Hare (1956) with Terence Morgan, and Carry On Admiral (1957) with David Tomlinson.

She later starred alongside Dana Andrews in the horror film Night of the Demon (1957), directed by Jacques Tourneur, and Hell Drivers (also 1957), which featured Stanley Baker, Patrick McGoohan, and Herbert Lom.

Cummins went back to comedies with The Captain's Table (1959), Your Money or Your Wife (1960), and Dentist in the Chair (1960).  Her last film was Darcy Conyers' In the Doghouse (1961), alongside Leslie Phillips.

Gun Crazy
In 1998, Gun Crazy (1950) was selected for preservation in the United States National Film Registry by the Library of Congress, as being "culturally, historically, or aesthetically significant."  Michael Adams wrote in Movieline in August 2009 that the film was "directed by B-movie specialist Joseph H. Lewis from a script co-written by MacKinlay Kantor and blacklisted Dalton Trumbo, "fronted" by his friend Millard Kaufman. Gun Crazy was made for $400,000 in 30 days in 1949.

Movieline found Cummins in 2009, still healthy.  "It was a great part", she said of Annie Laurie Starr. "It was a brilliant story from a brilliant writer.  We had a very good director and a great cameraman.  I think John Dall and myself were in those days quite well-suited in the parts we had."  The film played at the British Film Institute in London in February 2009.  At the screening, Cummins viewed the film with an audience for the first time in six decades.

Night of the Demon
On 14 June 2006, she appeared as guest of honour at a special screening of Night of the Demon in Borehamwood, Hertfordshire, hosted by the Elstree Film and Television Heritage Group. At the screening, she answered questions from the audience before viewing the film for the first time. She said she had never worked with her co-star Dana Andrews before, though she knew and liked him; they remained friends for the rest of his life.

On 29 September 2010, Cummins introduced the film Street Corner (1953) as part of the Capital Tales Event at BFI Southbank London hosted by Curator Jo Botting. She played Bridget Foster in the film written by Muriel and Sydney Box and directed by Muriel Box.

On 29 August 2013, Cummins introduced the world premiere of a digital remastering of Night of the Demon, screened by the British Film Institute in the courtyard of the British Museum. The screening location features prominently in the film, with shots of the courtyard before a key scene in which the psychologist Holden meets occultist Karswell for the first time in the British Library, which until 1998 was housed within the museum.

Personal life

In 1954, she became the First Honorary Commander of the 582d Air Resupply Squadron at RAF Molesworth, England to be designated by the United States Air Force Squadron.

She was married to Derek Dunnett (William Herbert Derek Dunnett) from 1950 until his death in 2000. The couple had two children; a son in 1954, and a daughter in 1962. Her husband, who came  from a wealthy family, was born in Epsom, Surrey, England, on 9 February 1921, and died in East Sussex, England, on 10 July 2000.

Cummins' film career ended in 1961, although she made a handful of television appearances up to the mid-1960s. During the 1970s, Cummins was active in a national charity, Stars Organisation for Spastics, raising money and chairing the management committee of a holiday centre for children with disabilities in Sussex. The charity, known as SOS, became an independent registered charity in 2001 and in 2008 changed its name to Stars Foundation for Cerebral Palsy. Cummins was a trustee of the charity which is run entirely by volunteers and raises funds for communication and mobility aids for people with cerebral palsy. In later life, she lived in West London.

On 25 January 2013, Cummins was honoured at the Noir City Film Festival at the Castro Theatre in San Francisco with a screening of a restored print of Gun Crazy.

Cummins died on 29 December 2017, eleven days after her 92nd birthday, at the Chelsea and Westminster Hospital in London, England, following a stroke.

Filmography

References

External links

 Peggy Cummins at BFI

1925 births
2017 deaths
People from Prestatyn
Irish film actresses
Irish stage actresses
Actresses from Dublin (city)
20th-century Irish actresses
Welsh people of Irish descent